Central Presbyterian Church is a historic church at 201 Washington Street SW in Atlanta, Georgia. It was founded in 1885 and was added to the National Register of Historic Places in 1986.

Its tumultuous history includes its difficult separation from the First Presbyterian Church of Atlanta in 1858, occupation by Union forces in 1864, and trials of church members for offenses such as allowing dancing at a teenager's Christmas party during the 1880s.

Following this “reign of terror” against “errant members" and then a period of healing, the church began to emphasize social justice.  During the 1930s, it became known as "the church that stayed" as other churches abandoned central Atlanta for the suburbs. Following the 1968 assassination of Martin Luther King Jr., the church focused on building bridges between white institutions and the African-American community.

Gallery

References

Links 
https://cpcatlanta.org/ - Official site

Presbyterian churches in Atlanta
Churches on the National Register of Historic Places in Georgia (U.S. state)
Gothic Revival church buildings in Georgia (U.S. state)
Churches completed in 1885
National Register of Historic Places in Atlanta
City of Atlanta-designated historic sites